Fedlim Mac Giolla Seanáin (died 12 July 1507) was a Brehon lawyer and Canon lawyer.

Mac Giolla Seanáin was a member of an Irish brehon family of south Ulster and north Leinster, originally from what is now County Tyrone.

The Annals of the Four Masters give his obituary sub anno 1507:

 Felim Maguinnsenain, Official of Tirconnell, a select Brehon, an ecclesiastic eminent for piety and benevolent deeds, died on the 12th of July.

The surname is now rendered as Gilsenan. Latter-day bearers of the name include the film-maker, Alan Gilsenan and netball player Selina Gilsenan.

External links
 http://www.ucc.ie/celt/published/T100005E/
 http://www.irishtimes.com/ancestor/surname/index.cfm?fuseaction=Go.&UserID=

Medieval Gaels from Ireland
15th-century Irish lawyers
People from County Tyrone
16th-century Irish lawyers
1507 deaths
Year of birth unknown